Siska or Šiška (Czech/Slovak feminine: Šišková) is a surname with multiple origins. The Czech/Slovak surname means conifer cone and is a cognate of Polish Szyszka and Ukrainian Shyshka. The same surname appears as Siska in Hungary.

People

Siska or Šiška
 Adam T. Siska, American musician
 Alois Šiška (1914–2003), Czech pilot
 Anna Šišková (born 1960), Slovak actress
 Indrek Siska (born 1984), Estonian beach soccer player
 Juraj Šiška (born 1996), Slovak ice hockey player
 Katrin Siska (born 1983), Estonian musician
 Petr Šiška (born 1965), Czech TV presenter and musician
 Thato Siska, Botswana footballer
 Xénia Siska (1957), Hungarian athlete

Szyszka or Shyshka
 Mariusz Szyszka (born 1988), Polish footballer
 Mykhaylo Shyshka (born 1994), Ukrainian footballer

See also
 

Czech-language surnames
Slovak-language surnames